Anna Marie Rosenberg (née Lederer; July 19, 1899 – May 9, 1983), later Anna Rosenberg Hoffman, was an American public official, advisor to presidents, and businesswoman.

Background

Anna Marie Lederer was born on July 19, 1899, in Budapest, Hungary, the child of Albert Lederer and Charlotte (née Sarolta Bacskai) Lederer. While sources have not agreed on her birth year, often using 1901 or 1902, her father's naturalization petition indicates the July 19, 1899 date--a date which is corroborated by Ellis Island intake documents and other sources. She had one sibling, an older sister, Clare Lederer (later Clare von Arnold). In 1912, the girls and their mother immigrated to the United States and joined Albert Lederer, who had immigrated to New York City in 1910. Anna attended Wadleigh High School for Girls. At the conclusion of World War I, while still at Wadleigh, Anna married an infantryman, and became Anna Rosenberg.

Career
As a high-schooler, Anna appeared in the New York Times for the first time due to her mediating a large student strike related to mandatory military training. Her advocacy for her fellow students and for women's suffrage sparked a lifelong interest in politics, and by the 1920s she was being mentored by Tammany Hall figures and Belle Moskowitz. Inspired by the older Moskowitz, Anna Rosenberg opened a public- and labor relations firm while continuing to be involved in Democratic politics in New York City. In 1928, Anna met Eleanor Roosevelt, whose husband was running for Governor of New York. Eleanor Roosevelt later described Anna Rosenberg as "a woman who penetrated [the] ‘old boy network’ through her ability, friendship with men of influence, and force of personality."

The New Deal
When Franklin D. Roosevelt won the presidency in 1933, Anna Rosenberg was considered for New Deal leadership positions. In 1934, Nathan Straus, New York State regional director for the National Industrial Recovery Act, made her his assistant. In 1936, Rosenberg succeeded him as regional director, becoming the only woman regional director.

After the Supreme Court gutted the NIRA in the 1935 case A.L.A. Schechter Poultry Corp. v. United States, Rosenberg became New York State regional director of the Social Security Board--again the only woman--and continued serving through 1943.

In 1938, FDR added to Rosenberg's duties, when he sent her to Europe with a commission to study labor practices; it was the first of three missions to Europe she made for Roosevelt (the other two were during World War II).

World War II
In the summer of 1941, President Roosevelt enlisted Rosenberg's help in addressing the demands of A. Philip Randolph that Black Americans be allowed to work in U.S. defense industries, from which work they had been systematically excluded. Together with New York Mayor Fiorello La Guardia and Randolph, Rosenberg helped formulate what became Executive Order 8802, which mandated equality in defense hiring, and its enforcement mechanism, the Fair Employment Practice Committee. During the years 1941 and '42 she concurrently served in the Office of Defense Health and Welfare Services, living up to her nickname "Seven-Job Anna." Historian Roger Daniels has described E.E. 8802 and the FEPC as "the first federal action[s] against race discrimination since Reconstruction."

From 1942 to 1945, Rosenberg served as New York State regional director of the War Manpower Commission. Concurrently, she served as a consultant to the Retraining and Reemployment Administration. While with the War Manpower Commission, Rosenberg developed the "Buffalo Plan," which solved multiple problems bedeviling wartime defense manufacturing. Her plan was rolled out nationwide. When he honored Anna Rosenberg as the first-ever recipient of the Medal of Freedom in October 1945, President Harry S. Truman said that without the Buffalo Plan, the "necessary manpower for war production would not have been attained."

In 1944, when President Franklin D. Roosevelt sent Rosenberg to Europe to report on the needs of American soldiers after their demobilization, she recommended education and supported the G.I. Bill of Rights. On a second wartime mission at FDR's request, Anna Rosenberg became one of the first Allied women to enter a liberated concentration camp, when she bore witness to the horrors of Nordhausen.  

Throughout the war years, Rosenberg shared a close friendship with President Roosevelt, and sometimes "smuggled food in to him", which they would eat in his office. A Chicago newspaper called her “perhaps the closest person to FDR, with the exception of Harry Hopkins.” Author Joseph Lelyveld claims that "Anna Rosenberg found her way onto [FDR’s] appointments calendar more easily than most cabinet members."

Assistant Secretary of Defense
In late 1950, President Truman nominated Rosenberg to be Assistant Secretary of Defense for Manpower and Personnel. Senator Joseph McCarthy and his staff launched an all-out campaign to oppose her nomination due to alleged connections to the Communist Party, but she was recommended by the Senate Armed Services Committee. In spite of opposition, on November 15, 1950 she was named Assistant Secretary of Defense, a post she held until January 1953.

When Rosenberg was sworn in as Assistant Secretary of Defense, she was the highest-ranking woman in the Department of Defense. She was to coordinate the Department's staffing, which was divided among many agencies. Also while in the position, Rosenberg worked to implement the National Security Act, promoted racial integration of the services, and supported legislation that safeguarded the rights of minorities in the military.

In 1955, New York City Mayor Robert F. Wagner Jr. selected her to serve on the New York City Board of Hospitals. Rosenberg also served on Governor of New York W. Averell Harriman's Business Advisory Council and co-chaired the National Hearth Committee. In 1959, she chaired a three-member panel to mediate between the New York City Transit Authority and two unions.

In the early 1960s, she served on the New York City Board of Education among other bodies.

Advisor to Presidents.
Often called a confidante of FDR, Anna Rosenberg was the top woman in the Truman administration; she was a close personal friend to Dwight D. Eisenhower and helped him pivot from the military to politics; she organized the 1962 birthday gala for President John F. Kennedy (made famous by Marilyn Monroe's rendition of "Happy Birthday"); and she counseled her friend Lyndon B. Johnson on issues ranging from the effect of automation on jobs to a more equitable formula for the Vietnam War draft.

Private sector 
In 1945, Rosenberg founded a consulting business, Anna M. Rosenberg Associates. The firm's customers included the American Cancer Society, the American Hospital Association, the American College of Hospital Administrators, Encyclopaedia Britannica, Inc., and Merriam-Webster. She continued to work at the firm until the day of her death.

Personal life and death
In 1917, Lederer became a naturalized U.S. citizen. In 1919 she married Julius Rosenberg (known as "Mike") and, in 1920 the couple had a son, Thomas. Anna Rosenberg worked with various foundations, including the Albert and Mary Lasker Foundation and the John Hay Whitney Foundation. In 1957 Anna separated from her husband, and after obtaining a divorce in 1962, she married Paul G. Hoffman, the first administrator of the Marshall Plan and a top United Nations official. Paul Hoffman died in 1974. Anna Marie Rosenberg died on May 9, 1983 in Manhattan. Rosenberg had been suffering from cancer since 1982.

Awards
 1943: Honorary degree (Master of Humane Letters) Russell Sage College
 1945: Medal of Freedom
 1947: Medal for Merit
 1951: Honorary degree (Doctor of Laws) from Tufts University
 1952: Honorary degree (Doctor of Humane Letters) from Columbia University

References

External sources

 
McHenry, Robert (ed.), Famous American Women: A Biographical Dictionary from Colonial Times to the Present, Dover Publications.
United States. Congress. Senate. Committee on Armed Services, Nomination of Anna M. Rosenberg to be Assistant Secretary of Defense. U.S. Govt. Print. Off., 1950. 381 pages
 Anna Rosenberg Hoffman Papers.Schlesinger Library, Radcliffe Institute, Harvard University.
McCarthy attacks Rosenberg's Nomination
Jewish Virtual Library entry
Another bio with picture, at National Park Service
Another bio on the Social Security site
Nelson, Anna Kasten. "Anna M. Rosenberg, an "Honorary Man"." The Journal of Military History 68, no. 1 (2004): 133-61. http://www.jstor.org/stable/3397251.

Anna M. Rosenberg's FBI files obtained through the FOIA and hosted at the Internet Archive

Part 1
Part 2
Part 3
Part 4
Part 5
Part 6
Part 7
Part 8
Part 9
Part 10
Part 11
Part 12
Part 13

1901 births
1983 deaths
American civil servants
Hungarian emigrants to the United States
Hungarian Jews
Medal for Merit recipients
Recipients of the Medal of Freedom
20th-century American businesspeople
United States Assistant Secretaries of Defense
Truman administration personnel
20th-century American businesswomen